This is the discography of American rapper Paul Wall from Houston, Texas. consists of thirteen studio albums, six collaborative albums, one remix album, six mixtapes, one EPs, twenty-three singles (including sixteen as a featured artist), and one promotional single.

Albums

Studio albums

Collaborative albums

Remix albums

Mixtapes

Extended plays

Singles

As lead artist

As featured artist

Promotional singles

Guest appearances

References

External links
 Paul Wall discography at Discogs

Hip hop discographies
Discographies of American artists